Buffalo Springfield is the debut album by the folk rock band Buffalo Springfield, released in December 1966 on Atco Records. Band members Stephen Stills and Neil Young wrote all the material on the album.

Most subsequent pressings of the album from March 1967 onward replaced the track "Baby Don't Scold Me" with the standalone single "For What It's Worth", which was ascending the US charts at the time. The single eventually peaked at number 7 on the Hot 100, while the album reached number 80 on the Billboard Top Pop Albums chart.

Background and content
Buffalo Springfield were formed in early 1966, playing their first gig at The Troubadour club in Hollywood in April of that year. An initial single that appeared on this album, Young's "Nowadays Clancy Can't Even Sing" sung by Richie Furay, failed to reach the national charts but made the Top 40 locally in Los Angeles during August. This album was recorded in the summer of 1966 at Gold Star Studios where Phil Spector created his "Wall of Sound" and Brian Wilson produced recordings by the Beach Boys. Young sings lead on only two of his five compositions, Furay singing lead on the other three.

The album was produced by the group's managers, Charles Greene and Brian Stone, both of whom had minimal experience as record producers. The group was reportedly unhappy with the sound of the album, feeling that it did not reflect the intensity of their live shows. The band asked Atco for time to re-record the album, but not wanting to miss the Christmas holiday season the label insisted that the record be released as it was.

Buffalo Springfield was originally released in both mono and stereo versions as Atco SD 33-200. The back cover contained band profiles of each member in the mode of those for Tiger Beat. Recorded the day the LP was released and issued soon after, the band's new single by Stills "For What It's Worth" became a national hit, making the top ten on the Billboard Hot 100 singles chart in March 1967. For the second pressing of March 6, 1967, the album was reissued as Atco SD 33-200A with the hit as the lead track, dropping "Baby Don't Scold Me" and slightly reconfiguring the running order. "Baby Don't Scold Me" has never been reissued in stereo; all compact disc releases feature only the mono mix of this track.

The album was remastered in HDCD and reissued on June 24, 1997, with two versions on one disc, the mono tracks from Atco 33-200 first with the stereo tracks from SD 33-200A following. Not contained were the stereo mix of "Baby Don't Scold Me" from Atco SD 33-200 or the mono mix of "For What It's Worth" from Atco 33-200A. Strangely, "Burned" has also never been issued in stereo for unknown reasons. It redundantly appears twice on this disc in mono.

Recording sessions took place at Gold Star Studios in Los Angeles from July 18 to September 11, 1966, with "For What It's Worth" recorded at Columbia Studios in Los Angeles on December 5, 1966.

Cash Box said that "Burned" has a "slick, mid-tempo rock arrangement that could catch on big."

Track listing

Original release

March 1967 release

Personnel
Buffalo Springfield
 Stephen Stills — vocals, guitars, keyboards
 Neil Young — vocals, guitars, harmonica, piano
 Richie Furay — vocals,  rhythm guitar
 Bruce Palmer — bass guitar
 Dewey Martin — drums, backing vocals

Production personnel
 Charles Greene, Brian Stone — producers, stereo mix
 Tom May, Doc Siegel, James Hilton, Stan Ross — engineers
 Sandy Dvore — design
 Henry Diltz, Ivan Nagy — photography
 Tim Mulligan — HDCD digital mastering
 John Nowland, Pflash Pflaumer — analog to digital transfers

Charts

References

Sources 

 
 

Buffalo Springfield albums
1966 debut albums
Atco Records albums
Albums produced by Charles Greene (producer)
Albums produced by Brian Stone
Albums recorded at Gold Star Studios